Stephanopodium magnifolium is a species of plant in the Dichapetalaceae family. It is endemic to Brazil.

References

Flora of Brazil
magnifolium
Vulnerable plants
Taxonomy articles created by Polbot